This is a list of people elected Fellow of the Royal Society in 1918.

Fellows 

Charles Bolton
Sir Henry Cort Harold Carpenter
Thomas Algernon Chapman
Cecil Clifford Dobell
Ernest Gold
Henry Brougham Guppy
Sir Albert George Hadcock
Archibald Vivian Hill
Sir James Colquhoun Irvine
Sir Gerald Ponsonby Lenox-Conyngham
Sir Thomas Lewis
Srinivasa Aaiyangar Ramanujan
Arthur William Rogers
Samuel Smiles
Sir Frank Edward Smith

Foreign members

William Wallace Campbell
Grove Karl Gilbert
Luigi Luciani
Jean Baptiste Perrin
Paul Sabatier

1918
1918 in the United Kingdom
1918 in science